Nicaise Kelebona (born 2 February 1995) is a Central African footballer who plays as a midfielder for Olympic Real de Bangui.

References

External links 

1995 births
Central African Republic footballers
Central African Republic international footballers
Olympic Real de Bangui players
Association football midfielders
Living people